Zinkenite is a steel-gray metallic sulfosalt mineral composed of lead antimony sulfide Pb9Sb22S42. Zinkenite occurs as acicular needle-like crystals.

It was first described in 1826 for an occurrence in the Harz Mountains, Saxony-Anhalt, Germany and named after its discoverer, German mineralogist and mining geologist, Johann Karl Ludwig Zinken (1790–1862).

References

Lead minerals
Antimony minerals
Sulfosalt minerals
Hexagonal minerals
Minerals in space group 173